Paul Hermann Wilhelm Taubert (12 August 1862 – 1 January 1897) was a German botanist.

Taubert was born in Berlin, where he studied botany as a pupil of Ignatz Urban. While a student, he collected plants in Cyrenaica (1887). From 1889 to 1895 he was associated with the Botanical Museum in Berlin, working as a scientific assistant in 1893–95. Afterwards, he embarked on a botanical expedition to Brazil, where he conducted botanical investigations in the states of Pernambuco, Ceará, Piauí, Maranhão and Amazonas. He died in Manáos on 1 January 1897 (age 34).

He was the taxonomic authority of many plant species. In 1893 Karl Moritz Schumann named the plant genus Taubertia (family Menispermaceae) in his honor.

Selected works 
 Monographie der gattung Stylosanthes. Verh. Bot. Ver. Prov. Brandenb. v. 32, p. 1-34. (1890) – Monograph on the genus Stylosanthes.
 Leguminosae in: Natürliche Pflanzenfamilien. Vol. III, 3. (1891).
 Leguminosae novae v. minus cognitae austro-americanae II ... Flora, v. 75, p. 68-86. (1892).
 Plantae Glaziovianae novae vel minus cognitae IV ... Engler's Bot. Jahrb. v. 17, p. 502-526. (1893).
 Beitrage zur kenntnis der flora des central- brasilianischen staates Goyaz ... Engler's Bot. Jahrb. v. 21, p. 401-457, pi. 2-3. (1895–96, with Ernst Heinrich Georg Ule) – Contributions to the knowledge of flora of the central Brazilian state of Goiás.

References 

1862 births
1897 deaths
Scientists from Berlin
19th-century German botanists